Suze is a commune in the Drôme department in southeastern France in the foothills of the Alps, its buildings are in a steeply-sloped village above a small tributary feeding into the Drôme which runs from the east into the Rhône.

Population

Landmarks
The village has a cross to Saint Pancras and has a medieval Roman Catholic church.

Geographic context
Gigors-et-Lozeron, Beaufort-sur-Gervanne, Cobonne, Aouste-sur-Sye, Mirabel-et-Blacons and Montclar-sur-Gervanne border Suze.

Etymology/topology
The name is a corruption of segusia, 'forceful', given to various elevated strongholds, made up of the components sego meaning 'force or vigour', and a suffix . The same etymology describes Suze-la-Rousse to the south in Drôme and in Piedmont, Italy: Susa, which has a French name, .

Personalities
Peter II, Count of Savoy was born in Suze in 1203.

See also
Communes of the Drôme department

References

Communes of Drôme